The Association of Supervisory Staffs, Executives and Technicians (ASSET), was a British trade union, chiefly representing supervisors in the metal working and transport industries. It was formed from the National Foremen's Association, founded in 1918.

History
In 1929 the National Foremen's Association merged with the Amalgamated Managers' and Foremen's Association, which was active in the mining industry. In 1942 the union changed its name to the Association of Supervisory Staff and Engineering Technicians and in 1946 it changed again to the Association of Supervisory Staff, Executives and Technicians.

In 1969 ASSET merged with the AScW (the Association of Scientific Workers) to form ASTMS (The Association of Scientific, Technical and Managerial Staffs).

ASSET's final General Secretary was Clive Jenkins.

Election results
The union sponsored Labour Party candidates at two general elections, and both were elected.

General Secretaries
1918: H. W. Reid
1939: Tom W. Agar
1945: Bob Bretherton
1946: Harry Knight
1960: Clive Jenkins

References

External links
Catalogue of the ASSET archives, held at the Modern Records Centre, University of Warwick

Defunct trade unions of the United Kingdom
1929 establishments in the United Kingdom
Trade unions established in 1929
Trade unions disestablished in 1969
Trade unions based in London